The Mecidiye class of paddle frigates consisted of four ships of the Ottoman Navy built in the 1840s.

Design
The ships of the Mecdiye class of paddle frigates were the first steam-powered warships to be built in the Ottoman Empire. The Ottoman government had previously ordered three small steam yachts for use by the sultan in the late 1830s.

Mecidiyes tonnage was 1,448 tons burthen, while the other three members of the class were 1,443 tons burthen. Their hulls were constructed with wood. The ships had a crew of 320 officers and enlisted men.

They were propelled by a pair of paddlewheels that were driven by a 2-cylinder direct-acting steam engine that was manufactured by Maudslay, Sons and Field. Steam was provided by two coal-fired boilers that were vented through a single funnel.

The ships were armed with a battery of two  shell-firing Paixhans guns on the upper deck, which were mounted on rotatable gun carriages. They also carried four 32-pdr guns also on the upper deck, and twenty-four 32-pdr guns on the main deck. The guns were all of British manufacture, as Ottoman cannon foundries lacked the expertise necessary to manufacture modern shell-firing guns.

In 1857, Mecidiye had her armament reduced to four of the 32-pounder guns on the main deck, while the other three retained twelve of their main deck 32-pounders. Feyzâ-i Bahrî was disarmed altogether in 1867.

Ships

Service history
In 1848, Mecidiye and Taif were used to ferry passengers to Samsun, as the Ottoman state-owned passenger service was not large enough to handle the volume of traffic. In May 1851, Feyzâ-i Bahrî visited the United Kingdom, the first time an Ottoman steam warship stopped in the country.

All four ships saw service during the Crimean War against the Russian Empire in 1853–1855; they operated together as a squadron commanded by Mustafa Pasha. They engaged the Russian frigate  in November 1853, but the action ended without a significant result. Later that month, Pasha took his squadron to Sinop, but he left shortly before the disastrous Battle of Sinop saw the annihilation of the Ottoman fleet at the hands of the Russian Black Sea Fleet.

After the war, Sultan Abdülaziz used Saik-i Şadi as a yacht, cruising aboard her frequently. In 1861, Taif was broken up for scrap. Feyzâ-i Bahrî served as a transport during Ottoman attempts to suppress the Cretan Revolt in 1866. Saik-i Şadi followed Taif to the breakers' yard in 1867. Feyzâ-i Bahrî was decommissioned in 1878 and sold for scrap two years later. Mecidiye was the last-surviving member of the class; in 1888, she was refitted in the Imperial Arsenal, and in 1890, she became a coal storage hulk. She was ultimately decommissioned in 1896 and later scrapped in 1903.

Notes

References